State Highway 74 is a state highway in New Zealand servicing the eastern suburbs of Christchurch. Mostly two-lane, it is composed of limited-access expressways, with part of the highway as the Christchurch-Lyttelton Motorway, and connects the city to its port town of Lyttelton.

Route
The highway begins immediately north of Belfast, with ramps connecting to the Western Bypass of the Christchurch Northern Motorway on State Highway 1. It then proceeds in a southerly direction on the Christchurch Northern Corridor (which opened in 2020) around the suburbs of Belfast, Northwood and Redwood.

At Mairehau, the highway turns east onto Queen Elizabeth II (QEII) Drive and begins its concurrency with the Christchurch Ring Road. As a dual carriageway, QEII Drive skirts through the northern suburbs of Christchurch, with major intersections at Innes Road and Marshland Road. After the Burwood Road traffic lights, the road changes name to Travis Road, drops to single carriage and runs in an easterly direction to the Anzac Drive/Frosts Road roundabout, where the highway turns right.

Now with the name Anzac Drive, the highway runs through the suburbs of Aranui and Bexley until reaching the Breezes Road/Bridge Street Roundabout. After the roundabout, the road changes name to Dyers Road. At Palinurus Road, the concurrency with the Ring Road ends, but Dyers Road keeps going in a southerly direction until the Ferry Road roundabout.

After the roundabout, the highway changes name to Tunnel Road and turns into the Christchurch-Lyttelton Motorway and passes through two interchanges before passing through the Lyttelton road tunnel.

In Lyttelton, the road changes name to Norwich Quay and acts as the main thoroughfare through the town and its associated port before terminating at the port gates as Gladstone Quay.

Route changes
The route of SH 74 has been rearranged quite frequently for a State Highway, initially gazetted in 1964 upon the opening of the Lyttelton Road Tunnel, it only consisted of the motorway and the short section through Lyttelton.

When State Highway 1 went through Christchurch was rerouted to bypass the city in the early 1990s, State Highways 73 and 74 were extended to cover much of the original route, with SH 74 initially continuing through at QEII Drive/Northcote Road to travel via Cranford and Sherborne Streets. In Christchurch CBD, the route turned left onto Bealey Avenue and then onto the parallel one-way roads Madras and Barbadoes Street. The road then turned left onto Moorhouse Avenue and then right onto Waltham Road before turning left again onto Brougham Street. The road then proceeded in a south-easterly direction until the Port Hills Road interchange with Tunnel Road. In 2004, the route was realigned to its current route, with much of the previous route either revoked or taken over by SH 73.

In November 2017, the Christchurch Northern Motorway's Western Bypass was opened, taking State Highway 1 to the west of Belfast, and State Highway 74's route was extended north along SH1's previous route up Main North Road from the Johns Road intersection to the previously existing motorway.

With the recent opening of the Christchurch Northern Corridor as a road of national significance, SH 74, bypasses the northern suburbs of Redwood and Belfast. Previously the highway followed Main North Road and the western section of QEII Drive. The Christchurch Northern Corridor opened in December 2020.

Major intersections

For Tunnel Road's major intersection, refer to Christchurch-Lyttelton Motorway

Spur sections

State Highway 74A is a minor Christchurch arterial road connecting the southeastern industrial suburbs of Bromley and Woolston. It was gazetted as a new state highway in 2003 at the same time SH 74 was shifted to its current location. It is just over 2 kilometres long and consists of three roads - Garlands Road, Palinurus Road and Rutherford Street. It runs concurrent with the Christchurch Ring Road for its entire length.

Major intersections

See also
 Christchurch-Lyttelton Motorway

References

External links
 New Zealand Transport Agency
   State Highway 74 on Google Maps
  State Highway 74A on Google Maps

74
Transport in Canterbury, New Zealand